The Panssarimiina m/S-39 and Panssarimiina m/S-40 are Finnish anti-tank blast mine that were used during the Winter War of 1939-1940. Due to the demand for mines during the Winter War, a cheap, easy to produce mine was needed. The m/S-39 was designed by a team led by Major A. Saloranta in October 1939, and it entered production on 8 November 1939. After one week's production at furniture factories in Lahti and Helylä over 2,000 mines had been produced. By the end of the Winter War 133,000 had been delivered. The m/S-40 was an improved version of the mine that differed in detail.

The mine is a square wooden box containing a large block of explosive, the top has a thick rim over which a wooden cover is placed. When pressure on the top of the mine increases, the wooden cover collapses, pressing down on the mine and triggering it.

During the Winter War the mine had the advantage of being difficult to detect with contemporary mine detectors, though by modern standards it has a high metal content.

Specifications
 Height: 0.045 m or 0.145 m
 Length: 0.228 m or 0.308 m
 Weight: 6.5 kg to 7.5 kg
 Explosive content: 3.0 kg to 3.8 kg of TNT or Chlorate-resin
 Activated pressure: 240 kg

External links
 Finnish anti-tank mines at Jaegerplatoon.net

Finnish anti-tank mines
World War II military equipment of Finland